Kedarnath Dev Ray (1561–1616 CE) was the Zamindar of Bikrampur, and among the most prominent of the Baro-Bhuyan in the Bengal region of the Indian subcontinent, who resisted against the Mughal Empire.

References

Mughal Empire
Titles in India
Indian feudalism
Indian landlords
People from Naria Upazila